Richard Milan Godlove (January 24, 1905 – September 15, 1985) was an American football and basketball coach and college athletics administrator.  He served as the head football coach at Ottawa University in Ottawa, Kansas from 1936 to 1942 and Washburn University in Topeka, Kansas from 1946 to 1968, compiling a career college football coaching record of 104–55–10. In 1964, he was inducted into the National Association of Intercollegiate Athletics Hall of Fame and served as the third president of the organization.

Coaching career

Ottawa
In January 1936, Godlove was named the 14th head football coach at the Ottawa University in Ottawa, Kansas and he held that position for seven seasons, from 1936 to 1942, compiling a record of 37–13–6.

The school inducted him into their athletic hall of fame in 1991.

Washburn
After Ottawa, Godlove was named the 25th head football coach at Washburn University in Topeka, Kansas, serving for 13 seasons, from 1946 to 1958, and compiling a record of 67–42–4.

During his first year at Washburn, Godlove, alongside Fran Welch of Kansas State Teachers, coached an "all-star" team made up of Kansas players that played a similar squad from Missouri in the "Mo-Kan Bowl" all-star exhibition game.

After coaching at Washburn, he remained as the school's athletic director while Ralph Brown succeeded him as head football coach.

Death
Godlove died at Topeka in 1985.

Head coaching record

Football

References

External links
 

1905 births
1985 deaths
Basketball coaches from Iowa
Ottawa Braves basketball coaches
Ottawa Braves football coaches
Washburn Ichabods athletic directors
Washburn Ichabods football coaches
Washburn Ichabods men's basketball coaches
People from Cerro Gordo County, Iowa